The New South Wales Z11 class  (formerly the M40 class) was a class of steam locomotives built by Beyer, Peacock & Company for the New South Wales Government Railways in Australia.

They entered suburban traffic in Sydney in 1891. They were primarily intended for use on the steeply-graded Main Northern line from Strathfield to Hornsby and North Shore line from Milsons Point to Hornsby, hence their hefty weight. They were never noted for spectacular performance.

Between 1906 and 1910, they were rebuilt with Belpaire boilers. They were superseded by the Class 30 and transferred for use on Newcastle suburban services. As part of the 1924 reclassification scheme, the remaining 13 members of the class were reclassified as the Z11 class, numbered 1101 to 1113, 50 having been sold to Australian Iron & Steel and 51 to the South Maitland Railway. Post renumbering, 1104 was to the Nepean Sand & Gravel Company, Richmond and 1111 to Southern Portland Cement, Berrima. The remainder were sold for scrap between 1925 and 1927. None were preserved.

References

External links

Beyer, Peacock locomotives
Railway locomotives introduced in 1891
Standard gauge locomotives of Australia
11
4-4-2T locomotives